Harun, also transliterated as Haroon or Haroun is a common male given name of Arabic origin, related to the Hebrew name of the Prophet Aaron. Both are most likely of Ancient Egyptian origin, from aha rw, meaning "warrior lion".

Given name

Haroon
 Haroon (singer), a Pakistani pop singer
 Haroon Khan, British boxer
 Haroon Rahim, Pakistani former tennis player
 Haroon Rasheed, a former Pakistani cricketer

Haron
 Haron Din, Malaysian politician (1940-2016)

Harun
 Harun al-Rashid (died 809), famous Abbasid caliph, reigned from 786 until his death in 809
 Harun ibn Muhammad, better known by his regnal name al-Wathiq bi'llah, Abbasid caliph who reigned from 842 until his death in 847
 Harun ibn Ahmad al-Mu'tadid, son of the Abbasid caliph Al-Mu'tadid (r. 892–902).
 Harun ibn Jaʿfar al-Muqtadir, Abbasid prince and son of Abbasid caliph al-Muqtadir (r. 908–932)
 Harun Babunagari (1902-1986), Bangladeshi Islamic scholar
 Harun Çabuk (born 1997), Turkish motorcycle racer
 Harun Doğan (born 1976), Turkish sport wrestler
 Harun Erdenay (born 1968), Turkish former basketball player
Harun ibn Altun Tash (died 1035), governor of Khwarezm
 Harun ibn Khumarawayh (died 904), fourth Tulunid Emir of Egypt
 Harun Karadeniz (1942–1975), Turkish activist
 Harun Tekin (born 1977), Turkish singer
 Harun Yahya (born 1956), pseudonym of Turkish cult leader and Islamic creationist Adnan Oktar
 Harun Farocki (1944–2014), German filmmaker
 Harun Idris (1925–2003), Malaysian politician 
 Harun Thohir or Harun Said, birth name Tahir bin Mandir, was an Indonesian soldier and terrorist who carried out the MacDonald House bombing on 10 March 1965. He was executed in 1968 alongside his comrade and accomplice Usman bin Haji Muhammad Ali for the murders of three people as resulted from the bombing.
 Harun Ripin, former accomplice of Mohamed Yasin Hussin. Harun was imprisoned for 12 years between 1973 and 1985 in Changi Prison for robbing a inhabitant on Pulau Ubin; the same one whom Yasin raped and killed during the robbery

Haroun
 Haroun Kabadi, Chadian politician
 Haroun (rapper), a French rapper in Scred Connexion

Surname

Haron
 Idris Haron, Malaysian politician

Haroon
 Hussain Haroon, Pakistani politician
 Yusuf Haroon, Pakistani politician
 Tariq Haroon, Pakistani cricketer

Haroun
 Ali Haroun, Algerian lawyer, first minister of human rights in the Arab world and member of the Algerian High State committee (collegial presidency) from 1992 to 1994
 Ahmed Haroun, Sudanese politician wanted for war crimes by the International Criminal Court
 Faris Haroun, Belgian footballer
 Nadjim Haroun, Belgian footballer

Harun
 Art Harun, Malaysian Speaker of Parliament, former activist
 Aminuddin Harun, Malaysian politician
 Dilara Harun, Bangladeshi politician
 Idrus Harun, Malaysian Attorney General 
 Rina Harun, Malaysian politician

Places
 Harun, İskilip

See also
 Haroonabad (disambiguation), cities and towns in Pakistan
 Islamic view of Aaron

Arabic masculine given names
Bosniak masculine given names
Turkish masculine given names